Miguel Ángel Delgado Reyes (August 28, 1947 – February 7, 1983) was a Mexican Luchador, or professional wrestler that wrestled under the ring name El Cobarde (Spanish for "The Coward"). Delgado was born and died in Ciudad Juarez.

Personal life
Miguel Ángel Delgado was a second-generation wrestler, son of the original Dr. X and the brother of wrestlers "Impostor" (later known as El Cobarde II) and "Legendario" He was the uncle of wrestlers Hijo del Cobarde, El Cobarde, Jr. and Impostor, Jr.

Professional wrestling career
El Cobarde was one of the first luchadors to travel and perform in Japan where he would compete in a number of matches, including unsuccessfully challenging for the NWA World Heavyweight Championship. He lost his mask in a Luchas de Apuestas ("Bet match") against his lifelong friend Fishman who he had originally trained at the start of Fishman's career. After the loss of his mask he remained with Empresa Mexicana de Lucha Libre (EMLL), turning from rudo (people who portray the bad guy characters in wrestling) to a tecnico ("Good guy")  and receiving standing ovations from crowds across Mexico, but especially in Ciudad Juarez, having become a "national idol".

Death and legacy
After losing his mask, Delgado struggled to stay in a prominent position, he eventually left the scene after learning he had Leukemia. He died on February 7, 1983, from the disease.

After his death his brother Francisco (who had wrestled as El Impostor up until this point) took over the El Cobarde ring persona and mask, becoming "El Cobarde II". The Cobarde II character spawned two different wrestlers working under the ring name "El Cobarde, Jr.", one the brother of El Cobarde (I and II) while the other was the son of El Cobarde II, another son wrestled under the names Hijo del Cobarde ("Son of El Cobarde").

Championships and accomplishments
Universal Wrestling Association
UWA World Light Heavyweight Championship (1 time)
Northern Mexico Middleweight Championship (1 time)
Northern Mexico Tag Team Championship (1 time) – with Golden Boy

Luchas de Apuestas record

Notes

References

1947 births
1983 deaths
Mexican male professional wrestlers
People from Ciudad Juárez
Professional wrestlers from Chihuahua (state)
Deaths from leukemia
Deaths from cancer in Mexico
20th-century professional wrestlers
UWA World Light Heavyweight Champions